Wake County Speedway "America's Favorite Bullring" is a quarter-mile NASCAR Sanctioned asphalt race track located in Raleigh, NC. The track holds stock car races on alternating Friday nights from April to September. It has six main classes of cars which include Late Model Stocks, Chargers, Legends, Mini Stocks, Mod 4s, Bandoleros, and bombers. The track also has special appearances from USAC, East Coast Flathead Fords, Southern Ground Pounders, the Southeast Super Truck Series, and the CARS Tour.

History
Wake County Speedway was established in 1962 by Glenn, Talmadge and Marvin Simpkins. It was leased out to Donald Macon until 1987.  The Simpkins family operated the speedway from 1987 until 2013. It was leased by Adam Resinick for 2 seasons.  Mike Stodder operated the track from 2015-2017.  Charlie Hansen signed a long term lease in 2018 and is currently operating the Speedway.
 
At its conception, the track was a 1/4 mile clay race track. Many former NASCAR drivers have made appearances during the tracks history. The drivers include J.D. McDuffie, Benny Parsons, Ken Schrader, Loy Allen, Jr., Dennis Setzer and Randy Renfrow. In 1987, the track was resurfaced with asphalt and remains that way today.

References

Sports venues in North Carolina
Sports venues in Wake County, North Carolina
1962 establishments in North Carolina
Sports venues completed in 1962